Emanuele Zonzini (born 17 February 1994) is a racing driver from San Marino, currently competing in the GP3 Series with Trident Racing.

Racing record

Career summary

Complete GP3 Series results
(key) (Races in bold indicate pole position) (Races in italics indicate fastest lap)

References

External links
 

1994 births
Living people
Sammarinese racing drivers
Formula Abarth drivers
Formula Renault 2.0 Alps drivers
GP3 Series drivers
ADAC GT Masters drivers

Euronova Racing drivers
Fortec Motorsport drivers
AV Formula drivers
Trident Racing drivers
Audi Sport drivers
Lamborghini Super Trofeo drivers